Redwood Middle School can refer to the following:

Redwood Middle School (Thousand Oaks, California)
Redwood Middle School (Saratoga, California)
Redwood Middle School (Napa, California)